Auckland Girls' Grammar School (AGGS) is a New Zealand secondary school for girls located in Newton, in the Auckland central business district. Established in 1878 as Auckland Girls' High School, it is one of the oldest secondary institutions in the country. The school closed its site temporarily in 1888 due to financial difficulties and classes for girls were held at Auckland Grammar School until the girls' school moved to new premises in Howe Street in 1909 and the name of the school changed to Auckland Girls' Grammar School. The school received the Goodman Fielder awards for School and Secondary School of the year in 2000.

The main block is listed as a Category II Historic Place.

Demographics
In 2018, Auckland Girls' Grammar School had 1,030 students enrolled and is 100% female. The number of international students was 22. The ethnic composition of the school was as follows: 23% Māori, 23% Samoan, 16% Tongan, 3% New Zealand European (Pākehā), 13% Asian, 6% Niuean, and 6% Indian.

Notable alumnae

Frankie Adams – actress
Zoë Bell – stuntwoman and actress
Sue Bradford – politician, activist and former Green MP
Dorothy Butler – author
Sandra Coney – journalist and women's rights activist
Kayla Cullen – athlete, Northern Mystics and NZ Silver Ferns
Lana Coc-Kroft – NZ Miss Universe 1988, television presenter
Emily Karaka – artist
Golriz Ghahraman – politician and Green MP, former United Nations lawyer
Kiri Allan – politician and Labour MP, Minister of Conservation, Minister for Emergency Management 
Parris Goebel – international choreographer
Katrina Grant – athlete, NZ Silver Ferns
Siositina Hakeai – athlete
Hon. Laila Harré – union leader, politician, former Alliance MP and Minister of Women's Affairs, Minister of Youth Affairs, Minister of Statistics, Associate Minister of Labour and Commerce
Doreen Lumley – athlete
Rose Matafeo – comedian, television presenter

Ani O'Neill – artist
Merimeri Penfold – Maori educator
Sheryl Scanlan – netball player
Miriama Smith – actress
Pauline Stansfield – disability rights advocate
Kahurangi Taylor – Miss New Zealand 2008
Munokoa Tunupopo – athlete, Auckland and White Ferns
Hon. Dame Georgina Manunui te Heuheu – politician, former National MP and Minister for Courts, Minister of Women's Affairs, Minister of Pacific Island Affairs, Minister for Disarmament and Arms Control, Associate Minister of Maori Affairs
Poto Williams – politician and Labour MP, Assistant Speaker of the New Zealand House of Representatives
Tammy Wilson – Black Ferns
Katrina Rore – netballer
Tiana Epati – First Pacifica President, and current President of the New Zealand Law Society

Headmistresses 

 Annie Whitelaw (1875–1966): 1906–1910
 Blanche Butler (died 1967): 1911–1921
 Rua Gardner (1901–1972): 1944–1967
 Louise Gardner (ca. 1916 – 2006): 1967–1978
 Ngaire Ashmore (born ca. 1967): 2017–present

References

External links
Ministry of Education Information

Heritage New Zealand Category 2 historic places in the Auckland Region
Educational institutions established in 1888
Girls' schools in New Zealand
Secondary schools in Auckland
1888 establishments in New Zealand